Longplay Album – Volume II is the second album by the Dutch soundalike studio group Stars on 45, released on the CNR Records label in The Netherlands in August 1981. In the US the album was retitled Stars On Long Play II, released on Radio Records and credited to 'Stars On'. In the UK, Ireland, Australia and New Zealand the album was listed as Stars on 45 Volume 2 or Stars on 45 - The Album - Volume 2, credited to Starsound and issued on CBS Records. Just like the first Stars on 45 album Longplay Album – Volume II was also officially released in the Eastern Bloc by state-owned czechoslovak label Opus, credited to Stars On 45 but under the title Stars on 45 - Volume II.

Information
The second Stars On 45 single in Europe was entitled "More Stars" and was a five-minute medley of eight hits by ABBA ("Voulez-Vous"/"SOS"/"Bang-A-Boomerang"/"Money Money Money"/"Knowing Me, Knowing You"/"Fernando"/"The Winner Takes It All"/"Super Trouper") coupled with a reworked version of the "Stars On 45 Theme" which became another UK #2 hit and indeed a Top 10 hit single in most parts of Europe. The eleven-minute 12" mix of "More Stars" however opened with another medley which combined excerpts from 60's and 70s hits mainly from the soul, R&B and folk rock genres; The Temptations' "Papa Was a Rolling Stone", Sly & the Family Stone's "Dance to the Music", The Rubettes' "Sugar Baby Love", The Flower Pot Men's "Let's Go to San Francisco", America's "A Horse with No Name", The Mamas & the Papas' "Monday, Monday" and "California Dreaming", Scott McKenzie's "San Francisco (Be Sure to Wear Flowers in Your Hair)", Barry McGuire's "Eve of Destruction", Smokey Robinson & The Miracles' "Tears of a Clown", The Supremes' "Stop! In The Name of Love", Neil Diamond's "Cracklin Rosie", Manfred Mann's "Do Wah Diddy Diddy", The Toys' "A Lover's Concerto", Four Tops' "Reach Out I'll Be There" and finally Simon & Garfunkel's "The Sound of Silence". In the US where ABBA's popularity wasn't on the same scale as in Europe or most other parts of the world at the time, Radio Records instead chose the first part of the medley, starting with "Papa Was A Rolling Stone", and released it as the follow-up to the second Beatles medley, but under the same title; "More Stars". The 12" mix of "More Stars", or "Stars On 45 Volume 2" as it was renamed in the U.K., was the same on both sides of the Atlantic.

For the creation of the second Stars On 45 full-length release producer Jaap Eggermont repeated the process from the previous album by dividing the 12" mix of "More Stars" into two parts. The ABBA medley was extended with another six titles and placed on Side B followed by a seven-minute extended version of the "More Stars" single's B-side "'45 Stars Get Ready", written by Eggermont himself and musical arranger Martin Duiser and featured an entirely new instrumental part which later on would be released as the B-side of "Volume III" ("Star Wars and Other Hits") and would be renamed "Stars On Theme".

The soul/R&B/folk rock part of the 12" "More Stars" medley was placed as track two on Side A, with two of the titles, the Motown hits "Tears of A Clown" and "Stop! In The Name of Love" reshuffled and moved to the end and thus musically connecting with the newly recorded "Supremes Medley". The European editions of Longplay Album – Volume II listed these as two separate medleys on the album covers but they had in fact been re-edited into one non-stop track with a total running time of 12:35 and was listed as such on the US edition. Despite the fact that the "Supremes Medley" appears on a number of best of compilations with Stars On 45 it was never issued as a single in either Europe or the US or anywhere else because Motown Records in 1981 seized the opportunity and re-issued the 1977 medley "The Diana Ross and The Supremes Medley of Hits" which featured six original Supremes recordings overdubbed with a similar disco arrangement. The Stars on 45 "Supremes Medley" consequently remained an album track.

The opening title "Star Wars and Other Hits" (on the US edition renamed "Introductions" and placed as the closing track on Side A) strung together an assortment of instrumental intros to songs from a wide variety of genres, from well-known movie themes like "Star Wars" and "The Good, the Bad and the Ugly", TV sitcom themes like "M.A.S.H. (Suicide Is Painless)", the main theme from Jeff Wayne's musical version of "The War of the Worlds", the overture from The Who's musical "Tommy", 60's and 70's hits like The Everly Brothers "The Sun Ain't Gonna Shine Anymore", The Stylistics' "I Can't Give You Anything (But My Love)", Derek and the Dominos' "Layla"(*), Free's "All Right Now", The Pointer Sisters' "Fire" and Gerry Rafferty's "Baker Street", disco hits like Carl Douglas' "Kung Fu Fighting", Rod Stewart's "Da Ya Think I'm Sexy", Boney M.'s "Ma Baker"(*) (featuring an uncredited spoken cameo by Dutch-American DJ Adam Curry), Village People's "Y.M.C.A.", Michael Jackson's "Don't Stop 'Til You Get Enough"(*) and Foxy's "Get Off" right up to Kim Carnes' "Bette Davis Eyes"(*) which had been a #1 hit in the US and most other parts of the world only a few months earlier. The intros medley was released as the third Stars On 45 single in Europe in late 1981 under the title "Volume III" (in the U.K. as "Stars on 45 Volume 3" by Starsound) and became their third UK Top 20 hit, peaking at #17. Unlike the two previous 12" releases with Stars On 45 it did not feature additional tracks, but had an extended break combining the Stars On 45 theme song with Foxy's "Get Off". The 12" version lists 5:57, 47 seconds longer than the album version. The B-side was entitled "Stars On Theme", an alternate mix of an instrumental part from the album version of "'45 Stars Get Ready", and expanded with the same extended break that featured on the A-side of Volume III, including the reference to Foxy's "Get Off".

(*) = not included on the US release "Introductions".

The Longplay Album – Volume II/Stars On Long Play II/Stars On 45 Volume 2 album in its entirety and in its original form, including single B-sides was reissued digitally in September 2021.

Track listing

Side A
1. "Star Wars and Other Hits" (UK title: "The Instrumental Medley") - 5:15 (US: - 4:25)

 "Star Wars Main Title" (Williams)
 "Can't Give You Anything (But My Love)" (Creatore, Perreti, Weiss)  
 "Kung Fu Fighting" (Douglas, Hawke)
 "Layla" (Clapton, Gordon) (song not included on the US release)
 "All Right Now" (Fraser, Rodgers)
 "Fire" (Springsteen)
 "Da Ya Think I'm Sexy?" (Stewart, Appice) 
 "Ma Baker" (Farian, Reyam, Jay) (song not included on the US release)
 "Y.M.C.A" (Belolo, Morali, Willis)
 "The Good, the Bad, and the Ugly" (Morricone)
 "Don't Stop 'til You Get Enough" (Jackson) (song not included on the US release)
 "Theme from M.A.S.H. (Suicide Is Painless)" (Mandel, Altman) 
 "The Sun Ain't Gonna Shine (Anymore)" (Crewe, Gaudio) 
 "Overture from Tommy" (Townshend) 
 "Get Off" (Driggs, Ledesma)
 "Stars On 45" (Eggermont, Duiser)
 "Baker Street" (Rafferty)
 "Bette Davis Eyes" (DeShannon, Weiss) (song not included on the US release) 
 "Eve of the War" (Wayne)

2. "More Stars" (UK title: "The 60's Medley") - 6:25
 
 "Stars On 45 (2)" (Eggermont, Duiser)
 "Papa Was a Rollin' Stone" (Whitfield)
 "Dance to the Music" (Stone)
 "Sugar Baby Love" (Bickerton, Waddington) 
 "Papa Was A Rollin' Stone" (Whitfield) 
 "Let's Go to San Francisco" (Carter, Lewis)
 "A Horse with No Name" (Bunnell)
 "Monday, Monday" (Philips)
 "San Francisco (Be Sure to Wear Flowers in Your Hair)" (Philips) 
 "California Dreamin'" (Philips, Philips) 
 "Eve of Destruction" (Sloan)
 "Cracklin' Rosie" (Diamond) 
 "Do Wah Diddy Diddy" (Barry, Greenwich)
 "A Lover's Concerto" (Linzer, Randell) 
 "Reach Out I'll Be There" (Holland, Dozier, Holland) 
 "The Sounds of Silence" (Simon)
 "The Tears of a Clown" (Cosby, Robinson)

3. "The Supremes Medley" - 6:10

All tracks written by Holland-Dozier-Holland unless otherwise noted
 "Stop! In the Name of Love" 
 "Love Child" (Taylor, Wilson, Sawyer, Richards) 
 "Reflections" 
 "Someday We'll Be Together" (Bristol, Beavers, Fuqua) 
 "Stars on 45" (Eggermont, Duiser)
 "Baby Love" 
 "Love Is Here and Now You're Gone" 
 "Where Did Our Love Go" 
 "I Hear a Symphony" 
 "You Keep Me Hangin' On" 
 "Ain't No Mountain High Enough" (Ashford, Simpson) 
 "Stars On 45 (2)" (Eggermont, Duiser)

Side B
1. "ABBA Medley" - 8:35

All tracks written by Benny Andersson and Björn Ulvaeus unless otherwise noted

 "Stars On 45 (2)" (Eggermont, Duiser) 
 "Voulez-Vous" 
 "SOS" (Andersson, Anderson, Ulvaeus) 
 "Bang-A-Boomerang" (Andersson, Anderson, Ulvaeus)
 "Money, Money, Money" 
 "Knowing Me, Knowing You" (Andersson, Anderson, Ulvaeus)
 "Fernando" (Andersson, Anderson, Ulvaeus) 
 "The Winner Takes It All" 
 "Super Trouper" 
 "Stars on 45" (Eggermont, Duiser)
 "Dum Dum Diddle" 
 "Lay All Your Love on Me"  
 "On and On and On" 
 "Super Trouper" 
 "Summer Night City" 
 "Gimme! Gimme! Gimme! (A Man After Midnight)"
 "Stars on 45 (2)" (Eggermont, Duiser)

2. "'45 Stars Get Ready" (Eggermont, Duiser) - 7:08

Charts

Personnel
 Claudia Hoogendoorn  - vocals (Agnetha Fältskog & Anni-Frid Lyngstad) 
 Jody Pijper - vocals
 Adam Curry - vocals, news announcer "Ma Baker"
 Maureen Seedorf - vocals (Diana Ross and the Supremes)

Production
 Jaap Eggermont - record producer
 Martin Duiser - musical arranger

Sources and external links
 
 
 Rateyourmusic.com biography and discography
 Dutch biography and discography
 [ Billboard.com biography and chart history]
 Official Charts, UK chart history
 Dutch chart history

References

Stars on 45 albums
1981 albums